Huarpe (Warpe) was a small language family of central Argentina (historic Cuyo Province) that consisted of two closely related languages. They are traditionally considered dialects, and include  Allentiac (Alyentiyak, Huarpe) and Millcayac (Milykayak).  A third, Puntano of San Luis, was not documented before the languages became extinct.

Kaufman (1994) tentatively linked Huarpe to the Mura-Matanawi languages in a family he called Macro-Warpean. However, he noted that "no systematic study" had been made, so that it is best to consider them independent families. Swadesh and Suárez both connected Huarpe to Macro-Jibaro, a possibility that has yet to be investigated.

Varieties

Loukotka (1968)
Varieties classified by Loukotka (1968) as part of the Huarpe language cluster (all unattested unless noted otherwise, i.e. for Chiquiyama  and Comechingon):

Oico / Holcotian - once spoken in Mendoza Province in the Diamante Valley.
Orcoyan / Oscollan - once spoken in the southern regions of Mendoza Province.
Chiquiyama - once spoken between the city of Mendoza and the Barranca River. (documented in Latcham 1927)
(Unattested.)
Michilenge / Puntano - once spoken in the Conlara Valley, San Luis Province. (Unattested.)
Olongasto - once spoken in La Rioja Province by the neighbors of the Allentiac tribe. (Unattested.)
Comechingon - extinct language once spoken in the Sierra de Córdoba in Córdoba Province, Argentina (documented in Cafferata 1926; Canals Frau 1944a; Serrano 1944, 1945)

Mason (1950)
Varieties of the Huarpe-Comechingon linguistic group cited from Canals Frau (1944) by Mason (1950):

Huarpe-Comechingon
Allentiac (Huarpe of San Juan)
Millcayac (Huarpe of Mendocino)
Puntano Huarpe
Puelche of Cuyo
Ancient Pehuenche
Southern Comechingón (Camiare)
Northern Comechingón (Henia)
Olongasta (Southern Rioja) ?

Pericot y Garcia (1936) lists Zoquillam, Tunuyam, Chiquillan, Morcoyam, Diamantino (Oyco), Mentuayn, Chom, Titiyam, Otoyam, Ultuyam, and Cucyam.

Comechingón varieties:
Comechingón
Main
Tuya
Mundema
Cáma
Umba
Michilingwe
Indama

Phonology 
The two languages had apparently similar sound systems, and were not dissimilar from Spanish, at least from the records we have. Barros (2007) reconstructs the consonants as follows:

Allentiac had at least six vowels, written a, e, i, o, u, ù. The ù is thought to represent the central vowel .

Vocabulary
Loukotka (1968) lists the following basic vocabulary items for the Huarpean languages.

{| class="wikitable sortable"
! gloss !! Allentiac !! Millcayac !! Henia
|-
! one
| lka || negui || 
|-
! two
| yemen || yemeni || 
|-
! three
| pultun || pultuni || 
|-
! head
| yoto ||  || 
|-
! tooth
| tuxe || tex || 
|-
! water
| kaha || aka || 
|-
! fire
| kʔtek || ketek || 
|-
! sun
| tekta || xumek || 
|-
! tree
| zaʔat || eye || 
|-
! maize
| telag || telam || 
|-
! bird
| zurú || zuru || lemin
|}

References 

 J. Pedro Viegas Barros, 2007. Una propuesta de fonetización y fonemización tentativas de las hablas huarpes, Universidad de Buenos Aires.
 Catalina Teresa Michieli, 1990. Millcayac y Allentiac: Los dialectos del idioma Huarpe
 Lengua Huarpe at pueblosoriginarios.com

 
Language families
Indigenous languages of the South American Southern Foothills
Languages of Argentina